The Brawling Act 1551 (5 & 6 Edw 6 c 4) was an Act of the Parliament of England.

This Act was repealed, so far as it related to persons not in Holy Orders, by section 5 of the Ecclesiastical Courts Jurisdiction Act 1860.

The whole Act was repealed by section 87 of, and Schedule 5 to, the Ecclesiastical Jurisdiction Measure 1963 (No 1).

Section 2
This section, from "further" to "aforesaide" was repealed by section 1(1) of, and Part I of the Schedule to, the Statute Law Revision Act 1888.

Section 3
So much of the Brawling Act 1551 as related to the punishment of persons convicted of striking with any weapon, or drawing any weapon with intent to strike as therein mentioned, was repealed by section 1 of the Offences against the Person Act 1828 (9 Geo 4 c 31). The marginal note to that section said that the effect of this was to repeal section 3 of the Brawling Act 1551.

See also
Brawling (legal definition)

References
Halsbury's Statutes,

Acts of the Parliament of England (1485–1603)
1551 in law
1551 in England